Negligent homicide is a criminal charge brought against a person who, through criminal negligence, allows another person to die.

Examples include the crash of Aeroperu Flight 603 near Lima, Peru. The accident was caused by a piece of duct tape that was left over the static ports (on the bottom side of the fuselage) after cleaning the aircraft, which led to the crash. An employee had left the tape on and was charged with negligent homicide. Other times, an intentional killing may be negotiated down to the lesser charge as a compromised resolution of a murder case, as might occur in the context of the intentional shooting of an unarmed man after a traffic altercation.

United States
In the United States, all states define negligent homicide by statute, often defining the offense as involuntary manslaughter. Negligent homicide may be a lesser included offense to first and second degree murder, meaning that all of the elements of negligent homicide are elements of those more serious charges.

In some states, negligent homicide charges are possible following the killing of a person while driving under the influence of drugs or alcohol.

See also
 Criminally negligent manslaughter, which has various titles in different countries
Depraved-heart murder

References

Homicide